Sammy is a popular humour Belgian comics series. It first started in 1970 in the weekly comic Spirou magazine, it has been published in book form, and even been the subject of several omnibus editions by Dupuis. Raoul Cauvin wrote the series while artist Berck (aka Arthur Berckmans) drew the first thirty or so adventures before being succeeded by Jean-Pol (aka Jean-Pol Van Den Broeck).

Set mainly in 1920s Chicago, the series centres on freelance bodyguards Jack Attaway and his sidekick Sammy Day. Their assignments have them protecting people from all walks of life, from young children to celebrities, fighting gangsters both at home and abroad and even facing elements of fantasy and science-fiction. The real-life gangster Al Capone and his sworn enemy Eliot Ness of the "Untouchables" are also regular characters. Although occasionally violent, the emphasis of the series is on humour.

The 40th book in the series was published in 2009 and it was announced that it would be Sammy's final adventure.

Synopsis
The series is based in 1920s Chicago at the height of Prohibition. Jack Attaway runs a bodyguard agency with his sidekick Sammy Day and their adventures take them all over the world. Although their main (and rarely lucrative) activity is protecting people, the pair have occasionally worked with the police.

Jack calls Sammy "p'tit" ("kid"), while Sammy addresses him as "patron" ("boss"), but they are close friends who stick by each other through thick and thin.

Their clients have varied from the average to the bizarre: ordinary people threatened by gangsters, movie stars, eccentric millionaires, mad scientists and even a 200-year-old skeleton back from the dead. Also requesting their help are actual crooks and gangsters like Al Capone or law-enforcers like Eliot Ness.

The series has delved on a number of themes ranging from Hollywood to the Ku Klux Klan, the Mafia, espionage and protection rackets, and also more fantastic elements like robots, the undead and the elixir of youth.

Publication history
Comics artist Arthur Berckmans, better known under his pen-name Berck, joined the staff of Spirou magazine in 1968 after working at rival Tintin magazine for almost ten years. His first strip at Spirou was the short-lived Mulligan, the adventures of an Irish tugboat captain in the docks of 1930s New York City. Berck wanted to draw adventures featuring gangsters, cops and robbers and it was suggested that he work with Raoul Cauvin, who had shown promise with the writing of the series Les Tuniques Bleues (French for "The Blue Coats").

Cauvin suggested a strip set in Chicago at the height of the Prohibition era which focused on a bodyguard agency rather than police or private detectives, arguing that this would give the strip a wider scope, taking the characters to various parts of the world and facing widespread situations.

The first story La Samba des gorilles (French for "Samba of the Gorillas") was published in 1970 in issues 1667 to 1677 of Spirou magazine. This was a short strip of 22 pages and was followed by a similar one later that year. Sammy was the titular star of both these stories, his boss Jack Attaway assigning him with the job of protecting people from harm and himself getting more involved later on in the plot. By the third adventure however, Jack, a classic hot-tempered but big-hearted figure, had taken over the strip with Sammy being his right-hand and providing the more common sense side of the operation. By the publishers' own admission, the series should have been called Jack Attaway et Sammy Day or just Les Gorilles (French for "gorillas", slang term for bodyguard).

The first two stories were published together in book form in 1972. Readers' reactions were positive and after four more 22-page stories, the strip evolved into the regular 44-page story format. Book editions followed, the 40th issue being published in 2009.

Berck retired in 1994 and the drawing of the strip was taken over by Jean-Pol Van Den Broeck, who goes by the pen-name "Jean-Pol".

Sammy gets prohibited
In Les Gorilles et le roi dollar ("The Gorillas and the Dollar King"), Jack and Sammy took on a network of corruption involving police, gangsters and politicians. When it appeared in book form in 1977, the French censor banned it from sale in France. The official reason was never given, but the publishers have suggested that the theme of corruption in society was too close to home for the censor's liking — a number of scandals having recently been exposed by the press. However, copies of the book were acquired in the French-speaking parts of Belgium and Switzerland, taken to France and sold "under the counter" — quite ironic for a story based on Prohibition. The ban was lifted when the book was re-submitted a few years later.

Main characters
The Jack Attaway - Gorilles en tout genre ("Jack Attaway - Gorillas of All Kinds") agency: gorillas being slang for bodyguards. Before the series began the agency was made up of about 20 men, most of whom got hospitalised while protecting a court witness. Then the agency had five members, including Jack, Sammy and three others called Jacky, Freddy and Tony. The last three appeared in a handful of adventures before being phased out.

Jack Attaway: the head of the agency, rough, tough, hot-tempered but with a heart of gold. He is always willing to take on any assignment that provides a hefty fee, though he seldom gets the opportunity to cash in on it. Although an honest man, Jack is on first-name terms with many leading underworld figures, including Al Capone, as well as law-enforcers like Eliot Ness.

Sammy Day: Jack's sidekick. They refer to one another as "boss" and "kid", but are close friends. Sammy tends to be the more level-headed of the two. He is more cautious than his boss, querying their missions, especially when they fail to get the full details beforehand (which Jack later regrets) but standing by him through thick and thin anyway — though it often means getting little in return in terms of monetary value for either of them and often ending up in hospital or even the insane asylum.

Al Capone: Chicago's most powerful gangster, who sometimes calls on Jack and Sammy to protect him from other crime lords. They do so grudgingly, though Capone's money can be a very powerful incentive.

Eliot Ness: the leader of the Untouchables, often calls on Sammy and Jack to help him in his feud with Al Capone and other crooks like Miss Kay.

Mrs Attaway aka Miss Kay: Jack's mother, a charming little old lady who is well aware that her son's business is not as successful as he makes out. She thus tries to find ways of raising a fortune which he will then inherit. To that end she has taken the name of "Miss Kay", recruited some pensioners from a local old folks home and gone into alcohol-smuggling and other illegal businesses. Sammy soon discovers this, but he also knowns how shattered Jack would be on knowing the truth: at one stage the dilemma even leads him to a nervous breakdown!

Lady O: a young woman who is an expert on weapons, martial arts and disguises. Originally hired by Capone after Ness had arrested his lieutenants, she then turned against the master criminal, aiming to take over his empire, with Sammy, Jack and Ness getting caught in the crossfire!

Stories
The Sammy series has not been published in English. Below is a list of the French titles, their year of publication, an English translation of the titles and a brief description. They are listed in order of publication.

References

External links
 Sammy at Dupuis website, in French.
 Sammy at Coinbd.com in French.
 Sammy at thrillingdetective.com in English.

Dupuis titles
Belgian comics characters
Belgian comics titles
Belgian comic strips
Fictional bodyguards
Fictional American people
Comics about police officers
Crime comics
Humor comics
Comics set in the United States
Comics set in the 1920s
Comics set in the 1930s
1970 comics debuts
2009 comics endings
Comics characters introduced in 1970